Andrew Montgomery Coats (born January 19, 1935) is an American politician. A Democrat, he served as mayor of Oklahoma City, Oklahoma from 1983 to 1987. He attended the University of Oklahoma and is an attorney. From 1996 to 2010, he was the Dean of the University of Oklahoma College of Law. He is also a former president of the American College of Trial Lawyers. From 1976 to 1980, he was Oklahoma County District Attorney. In 1980, he unsuccessfully ran in the United States Senate election to replace Henry Bellmon. He was inducted into the Oklahoma Hall of Fame in 2005. His son, Sanford Coats served as United States Attorney for the Western District of Oklahoma from 2009 to 2016. He is the most recent mayor of Oklahoma City to be a Democrat.

References

Mayors of Oklahoma City
1935 births
Living people
Oklahoma Democrats
University of Oklahoma alumni
University of Oklahoma faculty